This is a list of prisons within Qinghai province of the People's Republic of China.

Sources 

Buildings and structures in Qinghai
Qinghai